Samuel B. Moore (June 6, 1789 – November 7, 1846) was the sixth Governor of the U.S. state of Alabama from March 3 to November 26, 1831. He was president of the Alabama Senate when Governor Gabriel Moore was elected to the United States Senate, and so became governor when Gabriel Moore resigned to take the seat.

Biography
Samuel Moore was born in Franklin County, Tennessee, in 1789 but moved to Jackson County, Alabama, when he was still young.

His political career began in 1823 when he was elected to the Alabama House of Representatives and then elected to the Alabama Senate in 1828. He served as president of the Senate in 1831 when he succeeded Gabriel Moore.

Like his predecessor, Samuel Moore continued to survey the Coosa River through The Board of Internal Improvement, build infrastructure, and oppose nullification. Moore strongly supported the Bank of the State of Alabama.

Later, in the 1831 election, Moore was entrenched in a heated election battle against John Gayle, who eventually defeated him. After his defeat, he served as the judge of the Pickens County Court from 1835 to 1841.

He was re-elected to his State Senate post in 1834 and again served as the Senate's president in 1835. He later returned home to Pickens County, Alabama, and served on its county court from 1835 until 1841.

Moore died in 1846 at age 57 and is interred at the city cemetery in Carrollton in Pickens County.

References

External links

Biographies 
 History of Alabama and Dictionary of Alabama Biography by Thomas M. Owen (1978)
  The Governors of Alabama by John Craig Stewart (1975)

1789 births
1846 deaths
People from Franklin County, Tennessee
Democratic Party governors of Alabama
Democratic Party members of the Alabama House of Representatives
Democratic Party Alabama state senators
Alabama state court judges
19th-century American politicians
19th-century American judges